Under the law of Scotland, mobbing, also known as mobbing and rioting, is the formation of a mob engaged in disorderly and criminal behaviour. The crime occurs when a group combines to the alarm of the public "for an illegal purpose, or in order to carry out a legal purpose by illegal means, e.g. violence or intimidation". This common purpose distinguishes it from a breach of the peace.

"Mob"

In HM Advocate v Robertson (1842) 1 Broun 152, at 192 to 193, Hope L.J.-C. said in his direction to the jury:

He went on to say:

These passages were approved by the High Court, as an accurate statement of the law, in Hancock and others v HM Advocate 1981 SCCR 32.

Compensation for riot damage

See section 10 of the Riotous Assemblies (Scotland) Act 1822 and section 235 of the Merchant Shipping Act 1995.

References

Prosecution
Scottish criminal law
Crimes